The secretary of state for the colonies or colonial secretary was the Cabinet of the United Kingdom's minister in charge of managing the British Empire.

History
The position was first created in 1768 to deal with the increasingly troublesome North American colonies, following passage of the Townsend Acts. Previously, colonial responsibilities were held jointly by the lords of trade and plantations and the secretary of state for the Southern Department, who was responsible for Ireland, the American colonies, and relations with the Catholic and Muslim states of Europe, as well as being jointly responsible for domestic affairs with the Secretary of State for the Northern Department. Joint responsibility continued under the secretary of state for the colonies, but led to a diminution of the board's status, and it became an adjunct to the new secretary's department.

Following the loss of the American colonies, both the board and the short-lived secretaryship were dismissed by the king on 2 May 1782; both were abolished later by the Civil List and Secret Service Money Act 1782 (22 Geo. 3, c 82). Following this, colonial duties were given to the Home Secretary, then Lord Sydney. Following the Treaty of Paris 1783, a new board, named the Committee of Council on Trade and Plantations (later known as 'the First Committee') was established under William Pitt the Younger, by an Order in Council in 1784. In 1794, a new office was created for Henry Dundas – the secretary of state for war, which now took responsibility for the Colonies, and was renamed the Secretary of State for War and the Colonies in 1801. In 1854, military reforms led to the colonial and military responsibilities of this secretary of state being split into two separate offices, with Sir George Grey becoming the first secretary of state for the colonies under the new arrangement.

In the latter part of the nineteenth century, Britain gained control over a number of territories with the status of "protectorate".  The ministerial responsibility for these territories was initially held by the Foreign Secretary.  However, by the early years of the twentieth century the responsibility for each of these territories had been transferred to the colonial secretary as well.  The League of Nations mandated territories acquired as a result of the Treaty of Versailles in 1919 became a further responsibility of the Colonial Office in the aftermath of the First World War.

In 1925, part of the Colonial Office was separated out as the Dominions Office, with its own secretary of state. The new office was responsible for dealing with the Dominions together with a small number of other territories (most notably Southern Rhodesia).

In the twenty years following the end of the Second World War, much of the British Empire was dismantled as its various territories gained independence.  In consequence, the Colonial Office was merged in 1966 with the Commonwealth Relations Office (which until 1947 had been the Dominions Office) to form the Commonwealth Office, while ministerial responsibility was transferred to the secretary of state for Commonwealth affairs (previously known as the secretary of state for Commonwealth relations).  In 1968, the Commonwealth Office was subsumed into the Foreign Office, which was renamed the Foreign and Commonwealth Office (FCO).

The colonial secretary never had responsibility for the provinces and princely states of India, which had its own secretary of state.

From 1768 until 1966, the secretary of state was supported by an under-secretary of state for the colonies (at times an under-secretary of state for war and the colonies), and latterly by a minister of state.

List of secretaries of state for the colonies

Secretaries of State for the Colonies (1768–1782)

Sometimes referred to as Secretary of State for the American Colonies.

Office abolished in 1782 after the loss of the American Colonies.

Responsibility for the Colonies thereafter held by:
 Home Secretary 1782–1801
 Secretary of State for War and the Colonies 1801–1854
 Secretary of State for the Colonies from 1854

Secretaries of State for the Colonies (1854–1966)

Responsibility for the colonies held by:
 Secretary of State for Commonwealth Affairs 1966–1968
 Secretary of State for Foreign and Commonwealth Affairs 1968–present
Following the British Nationality Act 1981, the term "colony" ceased to be used; Britain's rule over Hong Kong, the last significant colony, ceased in 1997. Britain retains certain overseas territories.

Notes

Secretaries from the Colonies

A few title holders were born in colonies under their portfolio and some beyond:

 Bonar Law – born in pre-Canada colony of New Brunswick and later moved to the United Kingdom
 Victor Bruce, 9th Earl of Elgin – born in Canada during his father's, James Bruce, 8th Earl of Elgin, term as Governor General of Canada and a British appointee
 Alfred Milner, 1st Viscount Milner – born in Grand Duchy of Hesse (now in Germany) to Charles Milner (who had English roots from his father)
 Leo Amery – born in British India to an English father serving in India

See also
Colonial Land and Emigration Commission

References

Colonies
History of the Thirteen Colonies
Governance of the British Empire
Defunct ministerial offices in the United Kingdom
1768 establishments in Great Britain
1966 disestablishments in the United Kingdom
Foreign Office during World War II
 
United Kingdom